Miles Andrew Richardson (born 26 August 1991) is an English cricketer. He made his first-class debut on 2 April 2017 for Northamptonshire against Loughborough MCCU as part of the Marylebone Cricket Club University fixtures. He made his List A debut for Northamptonshire in the 2017 Royal London One-Day Cup on 30 April 2017.

References

External links
 

1991 births
Living people
English cricketers
Northamptonshire cricketers
Sportspeople from Maidstone